Espen Eriksen Trio is a Norwegian jazz piano trio formed in 2007, consisting of Espen Eriksen (piano), Lars Tormod Jenset (double bass) and Andreas Bye (drums).
The trio has released five albums on the Norwegian record-label Rune Grammofon. They have performed at Molde Int. Jazz Festival, Oslo Jazzfestival, Maijazz and Vossajazz in Norway, Jazz Province Festival in Russia and Penang Jazz Festival in Malaysia, in addition to several club performances in Germany, Switzerland, Great Britain and Malaysia.

Discography

Studio albums
 2010: You Had Me At Goodbye (Rune Grammofon)
 2012: What Took You So Long (Rune Grammofon)
 2015: Never Ending January (Rune Grammofon)
 2018: Perfectly Unhappy (Rune Grammofon), with Andy Sheppard
2020:  End of Summer (Rune Grammofon) 
 2022: In The Mountains (Rune Grammofon), with Andy Sheppard

Compilations
 2011 JazzCD.no #5
 2010: Twenty Centuries Of Stony Sleep (Rune Grammofon)
 2009: Runeology 4 (Rune Grammofon)

References

External links 

Reviews

Norwegian jazz ensembles
Norwegian musical trios
Rune Grammofon artists
Musical groups established in 2007
2007 establishments in Norway
Piano trios
Musical groups from Norway with local place of origin missing